Lake Kan-ac-to is a small lake northeast of Old Forge in Herkimer County, New York.

See also
 List of lakes in New York

References 

Kan-ac-to
Kan-ac-to